Shamsutdin (Şämsetdin) is a rural locality (a village) in Kusekeyevsky Selsoviet, Birsky District, Bashkortostan, Russia. The population was 56 as of 2010. There is 1 street.

Geography 
Shamsutdin is located 13 km west of Birsk (the district's administrative centre) by road. Popovka is the nearest rural locality.

References 

Rural localities in Birsky District